Roton Music is an independent Romanian record label established in 1994.

The company has hundreds of employees, having offices in Bucharest, Iași, Cluj and Timișoara. 

In 2011, Roton Music entered into a licensing deal with Warner Music Group for some of its most popular artists and their catalogue. In October 2015, Warner Music and Roton extended their distribution deal to include Latin America, until 2020. 

The Roton Music record label is composed of four sub-labels:
 Roton Music
 INAMEIT 
 Clopoțelul Magic / Magic Bell 
 Tezaur 

Roton Music's partners:
 HaHaHa Production 
 Uninvited Artists 
 Seek Music

Major artists 
 
 Akcent
 Fly Project
 Manuel Riva
 Misha Miller
 Otilia
 Serena
 Sasha Lopez

Former artists 

 Alexandra Stan
 Amna
 Anda Adam 
 Andeeno Damassy
 Antonia Iacobescu
 Andreea Bălan
 Criss Blaziny
 Connect-R
 Corina
 Dan Bălan
 Emil Lassaria
 Inna
 Mihail
 Radio Killer
 Simplu
 Smiley

Other artists 
  
 Ahmed Chawki
 Basshunter
 Sak Noel
 Pitbull
 Willy William

References

External links 
 
 
 

1994 establishments in Romania 
Record labels established in 1994 
Romanian music
Romanian record labels